In combinatorial mathematics, the exponential formula (called the polymer expansion in physics) states that the exponential generating function for structures on finite sets is the exponential of the exponential generating function for connected structures.
The exponential formula is a power-series version of a special case of Faà di Bruno's formula.

Statement
For any formal power series of the form

we have

where

and the index  runs through the list of all partitions  of the set
. (When  the product is empty and by definition equals .)

One can write the formula in the following form:

and thus

where  is the th complete Bell polynomial.

Examples
  because there is one partition of the set  that has a single block of size , there are three partitions of  that split it into a block of size  and a block of size , and there is one partition of  that splits it into three blocks of size .
 If  is the number of graphs whose vertices are a given -point set, then  is the number of connected graphs whose vertices are a given -point set.
 There are numerous variations of the previous example where the graph has certain properties: for example, if  counts graphs without cycles, then  counts trees (connected graphs without cycles).
 If  counts directed graphs whose  (rather than vertices) are a given  point set, then  counts connected directed graphs with this edge set.

Applications
In applications, the numbers  often count the number of some sort of "connected" structure on an -point set, and the numbers  count the number of (possibly disconnected) structures. The numbers  count the number of isomorphism classes of structures on  points, with each structure being weighted by the reciprocal of its automorphism group, and the numbers  count isomorphism classes of connected structures in the same way.

In quantum field theory and statistical mechanics, the partition functions , or more generally correlation functions, are given by a formal sum over Feynman diagrams. The exponential formula shows that  can be written as a sum over connected Feynman diagrams, in terms of connected correlation functions.

See also

References

  Chapter 5 page 3

Exponentials
Enumerative combinatorics